Ryan Dominic Bertrand (born 5 August 1989) is an English professional footballer who plays as a left-back for Premier League club Leicester City.

Bertrand began his youth career at Gillingham, before signing for Chelsea in July 2005. He graduated from Chelsea's youth system and was sent on loan to various clubs between 2006 and 2010. He made his full debut for Chelsea on in April 2011, six years after joining them, in a fixture against Birmingham City. In the 2011–12 season, Bertrand signed a new four-year contract with Chelsea and was made understudy to Ashley Cole. In May 2012, Bertrand became the first player to make his Champions League debut in the final, starting in an unfamiliar left wing role in front of Cole; Chelsea beat Bayern Munich 4–3 on penalties.

Bertrand is an England international, having also represented 'the Young Lions' at under-17, under-18, under-19, under-20, under-21 levels, as well as Great Britain at the 2012 Summer Olympics. He made his debut for the England senior team in August 2012 in a friendly against Italy, in a 2–1 win.

Early life
Bertrand was born in Southwark, London. He joined Gillingham aged nine, progressing through their youth system. Bertrand attended the Robert Napier School in Gillingham, Kent.

Club career

Chelsea
Bertrand was signed by Chelsea in July 2005 from Gillingham for an initial £125,000, which was set by a tribunal and was subject to increases depending on progress.

Loan spells

During the 2006–07 season, he was twice sent on loan to AFC Bournemouth, at the same time as Chelsea teammate Jack Cork. He suffered a ruptured spleen in a youth team match against Arsenal that ruled him out of the later part of that season.

In August 2007, Bertrand joined Oldham Athletic on loan until January 2008.

On 4 January 2008, a matter of days after his spell at Oldham came to an end, Bertrand joined Norwich City on loan for the rest of the 2007–08 season. He put in a number of impressive displays playing at both left-back and on the left wing, and admitted he would welcome a longer stay with the club. Bertrand became popular with the Carrow Road crowd earning him the nickname 'Plastic' in reference to the Belgian singer Plastic Bertrand. On 4 July 2008, he rejoined the club on loan until January 2009, with an option to extend to the end of the season.

On 17 July 2009, Bertrand joined Reading on a season-long loan. He scored his first professional goal against Derby County on 10 March 2010. He came third in the voting for Reading's player of the season, behind Gylfi Sigurðsson and Jimmy Kébé.

On 5 August 2010, Bertrand signed on loan with Championship club Nottingham Forest in an initial six-month deal. He made his debut for Forest as a substitute in a 1–0 away defeat against Burnley. He was a regular for Forest for whom he made a total of 19 appearances. Forest were interested in either extending Bertrand's loan spell for the rest of the season or to sign him permanently but when his loan period expired on 3 January 2011 he returned to his parent club Chelsea.

Return to Chelsea

2010–11 season

Bertrand made his Premier League debut on 20 April 2011, when he came on as substitute to replace Ashley Cole in a 3–1 win against Birmingham City. Bertrand also made a goal, providing a cross which Florent Malouda headed past Birmingham goalkeeper Ben Foster.

On 15 July 2011, Bertrand signed a new four-year contract with Chelsea.

He was used as a back-up to Cole by Chelsea manager Carlo Ancelotti, as he remained with Chelsea and left-back Patrick van Aanholt went out on loan. Six years after signing for Chelsea as a schoolboy, Bertrand made his first starting appearance, against Fulham in the League Cup. The match finished in favour of Chelsea, who won on penalties 4–3, as the match ended goalless.

2011–12 season
During the 2011–12 season, Bertrand played 90 minutes in Chelsea's 2–0 defeat against Liverpool in the League Cup. He made his first league appearance of the season coming on as a late substitute for Ashley Cole against Everton, the match ended in a 2–0 defeat for Chelsea. Bertrand was handed his first Premier League start against Wigan Athletic on 7 April, in which he produced an outstanding performance, as Chelsea won 2–1 and he was named fan's man of the match. He was again named man of the match in his third start, a 0–0 draw with Arsenal on 21 April. On 5 May, Bertrand won the FA Cup with Chelsea, but he did not appear on the pitch in the win against Liverpool.

Bertrand made his European debut in the 2012 UEFA Champions League Final against Bayern Munich on 19 May 2012, playing on the left of midfield, becoming the first player in the Champions League era to make his debut in the final. He was substituted with a knock after 70 minutes and replaced by Florent Malouda as Chelsea edged out Bayern 4–3 on penalties.

2012–13 season
Bertrand scored his first professional goal for Chelsea in the Community Shield match against Manchester City on 12 August 2012, which they went on to lose 3–2. He started in the first league match of the season against Wigan Athletic playing as a winger. On 5 September 2012, Bertrand signed a new improved five-year contract with Chelsea. On 25 September, he scored his second professional goal in a League Cup match against Wolverhampton Wanderers at Stamford Bridge, which Chelsea won 6–0.

On 1 April 2013, he came on as a replacement for Ashley Cole in the FA Cup quarter-final replay against Manchester United, which Chelsea went on to win 1–0. It was revealed after the match that Cole would be sidelined for at least two weeks, leaving Bertrand as the clubs only recognised left-back. He started the next match, the Europa League quarter-final first leg against Rubin Kazan at Stamford Bridge, putting in a strong performance as Chelsea ran out 3–1 winners. On 7 April, Bertrand made his 50th Chelsea appearance in a 2–1 win against Sunderland.

He started at left-back in the FA Cup semi-final against Manchester City at Wembley Stadium on 14 April, which ended in a 2–1 defeat for Chelsea. In the continued absence of Ashley Cole, Bertrand started and performed well in the next league match in the West London derby against Fulham at Craven Cottage on 17 April, which Chelsea comfortably won 3–0 thanks to a 30-yard strike from David Luiz and a brace from John Terry.

Aston Villa (loan)
On 17 January 2014, Bertrand joined Aston Villa on loan for the remainder of the 2013–14 season. He made his debut the next day in a 2–2 draw with Liverpool.

Southampton
On 30 July 2014, Bertrand joined Southampton on loan for the 2014–15 season. He made his competitive debut for the club on 17 August in their first match of the league season, playing the full 90 minutes of a 2–1 defeat away to Liverpool. Bertrand scored for Southampton the first time on 27 September, opening a 2–1 home win against Queens Park Rangers. His second goal for the club came on 26 December, in a 3–1 victory over Crystal Palace. On 1 February 2015, he was given a straight red card at the end of a 0–1 home loss against Swansea City for a foul on Modou Barrow.

On 2 February 2015, Bertrand completed a permanent move to Southampton, signing a -year deal for an undisclosed fee, reported to be £10 million. On 26 April, he was the only Southampton player named in the PFA Team of the Year.

Bertrand scored his only goal of the 2015–16 season in the final match, a penalty in a 4–1 win over Crystal Palace. On 12 July 2016, Bertrand signed a new five-year contract.

On 12 May 2021, Southampton announced that Bertrand would leave the club when his contract expired in the summer.

Leicester City
On 15 July 2021, Bertrand joined Premier League club Leicester City on a free transfer, signing a two-year contract. Bertrand made his debut for the club in Leicester's 1–0 triumph over reigning Premier League champions Manchester City in the Community Shield on 7 August 2021.

International career

England youth
Bertrand has represented England youth teams at under-17, under-18, under-19, under-20 and under-21 levels.

He was part of the U19 squad at the 2008 European Championship.

He was promoted to the U21s and called up for several 2009 European Championship qualifiers, but missed out of the squad for the final tournament. On 14 November, Stuart Pearce selected him at left-back for an under-21 match against Portugal at Wembley in Group 9 of the qualification process, and helped the team keep first clean sheet since 29 June 2009. He was named in the England under-21 squad for the 2011 European Championship and played all matches.

Great Britain Olympic
On 2 July 2012, Bertrand was named in Stuart Pearce's 18-man squad for the 2012 Summer Olympics. He played his first match for Great Britain on 20 July 2012 in a friendly match against Brazil. He played three matches during the Olympic tournament.

Senior team
On 10 August 2012, Bertrand was called up to the senior England team for the first time, for a friendly match against Italy. He made his international debut coming on for Leighton Baines in the 78th minute and cleared a shot off the line minutes later from Manolo Gabbiadini which eventually led to England's winning goal as England won the match 2–1.

On 11 September 2012, Bertrand came on after 73 minutes in the 2014 FIFA World Cup qualification match against Ukraine and crossed the ball that led to the penalty that Frank Lampard converted. On 8 October 2012, Bertrand was called up to the England squad for two more qualifying matches, against San Marino and Poland. However he missed both matches because of a virus.

Bertrand came on as a substitute for England away to Italy on 3 March 2015 and he won his fourth full cap, starting for England against Republic of Ireland in Dublin on 7 June 2015.

Bertrand was part of the squad for UEFA Euro 2016. On 1 September 2017, Bertrand scored his first goal for England in a 4–0 World Cup qualifier win over Malta.

Style of play
Bertrand has been described as a modern-day full-back who gives assistance in attacking down the flanks, keeping and retaining possession as well as defending and reclaiming possession, making quick runs into the box and often does one-two's with his teammates. Bertrand was described by Glenn Roeder, his manager at Norwich, as a defender who "likes to bomb forward and is tenacious in the tackle when defending." In a 2018 ESPN FC article about the state of left-backs in England, Michael Cox said that the "only real star is Ryan Bertrand, a truly excellent full-back defensively and offensively".

Business ventures
Bertrand is a founder of the fintech brokerage Silicon Markets which provides machine learning and algorithmic trading tools for retail traders in the Foreign Exchange and CFD markets.

Career statistics

Club

International

As of match played 14 November 2017. England score listed first, score column indicates score after each Bertrand goal.

Honours
Chelsea
FA Cup: 2011–12
UEFA Champions League: 2011–12
UEFA Europa League: 2012–13
Southampton
EFL Cup runner-up: 2016–17

Leicester City
FA Community Shield: 2021

Individual
PFA Team of the Year: 2014–15 Premier League

References

External links

 Ryan Bertrand at Leicester City F.C.
 
 
 
 
 

1989 births
Living people
Footballers from Southwark
English footballers
England youth international footballers
England under-21 international footballers
England international footballers
Association football defenders
Gillingham F.C. players
Chelsea F.C. players
AFC Bournemouth players
Oldham Athletic A.F.C. players
Norwich City F.C. players
Reading F.C. players
Nottingham Forest F.C. players
Aston Villa F.C. players
Southampton F.C. players
Leicester City F.C. players
English Football League players
Premier League players
UEFA Champions League winning players
UEFA Euro 2016 players
Olympic footballers of Great Britain
Footballers at the 2012 Summer Olympics
Black British sportsmen
English people of Irish descent